John Turner (born 7 July 1932) is a British television actor.

Career 
One of Turner's most recognisable roles was that of Roderick Spode (6 episodes, 1991–1993) in the ITV television series Jeeves and Wooster, based on the P. G. Wodehouse novels. He had performed the same role earlier in his career at Her Majesty's Theatre, London in Andrew Lloyd Webber's musical flop Jeeves.

Turner made his television debut in 1957, playing a hillbilly in Operation Fracture.

In 1963 he appeared in 5/13 episodes of The Sentimental Agent as Bill Randall and in four episodes replaced the lead character played by Carlos Thompson.

In a career that lasted more than 40 years, he also appeared in 36 episodes of Knight Errant Limited as Adam Knight (1959–1960), as well as in episodes of Z-Cars (1967), The Saint (1968), The Champions (1968), Fall of Eagles (1974), the TV mini series Lorna Doone (1976), Heartbeat (1992), The Adventures of Young Indiana Jones (1999) and The Bill (2000).

Film roles include John in Behemoth the Sea Monster (1959), Lieutenant Pattinson in Petticoat Pirates (1961), Sir Richard Fordyke in The Black Torment (1964), Joab in Captain Nemo and the Underwater City (1969), The Major-domo in The Slipper and the Rose (1976), the Afrikaner Minister in The Power of One (1992), Rasputin: Dark Servant of Destiny (1996) and Lord Lot in Merlin (1998).

Selected filmography
 Nowhere to Go (1958)
 The Giant Behemoth (1959)
 Petticoat Pirates (1961)
 The Black Torment (1964)
 Captain Nemo and the Underwater City (1969)
 The Slipper and the Rose (1976)
 The Power of One (1992)
 Rasputin: Dark Servant of Destiny (1996)
 Merlin (1998)

References

External links

1932 births
Living people
English male television actors
English male film actors
People educated at Nottingham High Pavement Grammar School